Pilal (from Mandarin Chinese Pilale   or ) is a township of Akto County in Xinjiang Uygur Autonomous Region, China. It has 22 administrative villages and a farm under its jurisdiction. Its seat is at Pilal Village .

Name

The name of Piral is from Uighur language, that evolved from the word "pul-al", meaning "paying" or "pay money". The place was named Pilal because there used to be a market in this place 270 years ago (about 1750s).

History
In 1958, Pilal Commune was established.

In 1967 during the Cultural Revolution, Pilal Commune was renamed Hongqi Commune (literally 'Red Flag Commune').

In 1984, the commune became Pilal Township.

In September 2017, it was reported that a policewoman from Pilal had claimed that "several thousand detainees" were in the Xinjiang re-education camps system in Akto County, saying the facilities were "closed schools" where authorities keep internees "detained day and night, and they continuously receive political and ideological education." She further commented that, "A few people are released after two or three months. But most detainees are sent to the camps indefinitely."

Geography and resources

The township of Pilal is located between 75°45′- 76°01′ east longitude and 38°08′- 39°16′ north latitude and in the alluvial plain of Gez River to the northwest of the county seat. It is bordered by Tortayi Farm to the east, by Barin Township, Akto Town and Ujme Township to the south, by Buraksu Township of Shufu County to the west, by the 41st Regiment of the XPCC across Yuepuhu River to the north. Its maximum distance is 24 kilometers from west to east and 11 kilometers from north to south. It has an area of 186 square kilometers with an area of 6 118 hectares of arable land. The distance between the seat of the township and the county seat is 11 kilometers.

The township has a temperate continental arid climate with a long frost-free period. Its  annual average temperature is 12 ℃, the average temperature in January is -7.4 C, and the average temperature in July is 24.9℃. Its terrain is flat with sufficient water source. It is rich in mineral resources, mainly iron, copper, gold, aluminum, zinc and coal.

The soil is fertile, part of which are silt and salt soil. The natural conditions for developing agriculture are very advantageous. Pilal Township has a long history of planting rice. It is known as the “Plateau Rice land” and is the main rice producing area in Akto County.

Administrative divisions

The township has 22 administration villages and a farm under its jurisdiction.

22 administration villages
 Aktiqi Village (Aketiqi, Aktiqicun) 
 Aktu Village (Aketu, Aketucun) 
 Beshterek Village (Baishitiereke)
 Dongdore Village (Dundure)
 Hoiraldi Village (Huoyila'aledi;  / )
 Karasu Village (Kalasu)
 Kosula Village (Kuosala)
 Paraqi Village (Palaqi)
 Pilal Village (Pilale)
 Qarbag Village (Qia'erbage)
 Qongbash Village (Qiongbashi)
 Suluk Village (Suluke, Sulukecun) 
 Tazilk Village (Tazileke)
 Togqi Village (Tuogeqi)
 Tograk Village (Tuogelake)
 Tuanjie Village
 Wuzunra Village (Wuzunla)
 Yengarpa Village (Ying'a'erpa)
 Yengbag Village (Yingbage)
 Yikqil Village (Yikeqilai)
 Yinak Village (Yinake)
 Yiyelgan Village

 a farm
 Qingnian Farm ( / )

 Unincorporated villages  
 Karlik

Demographics

, 93.1% of the residents of Pilal were Uyghur.

Economy
Water resources are plentiful. Japonica rice is produced in abundance and Pilal is the main rice producing area of Akto County.

References 

Township-level divisions of Akto County